James Brandon may refer to:

James Brandon (footballer) (1867–1934), Scottish footballer
James Brandon (journalist), British journalist
James Brandon (colonel) (1734–1790), Colonel in the North Carolina militia during the American Revolution
James Brandon, character in All for Peggy
James Brandon, Stand-up comedian, member of The Grumbleweeds
James Rodger Brandon (1927–2015), American professor of Asian theater at the University of Hawaii
Jamie Brandon (born 1998), Scottish footballer (Heart of Midlothian FC)

See also

Jim Brandon (disambiguation)
Brandon James (born 1987), American football player